Curculio uniformis, the filbert weevil, is a species of true weevil in the beetle family Curculionidae.

References

Further reading

 
 

Curculioninae
Articles created by Qbugbot
Beetles described in 1857